Mont Blava is a mountain of the Pennine Alps, overlooking the Lac des Dix in the canton of Valais.

References

External links
 Mont Blava on Hikr

Mountains of the Alps
Mountains of Switzerland
Mountains of Valais
Two-thousanders of Switzerland